Kim Shin (born 30 March 1995) is a South Korean forward for Gimhae FC. Besides South Korea, he has played in France.

Career
Kim joined Jeonbuk Hyundai in 2014 and made his debut in the 2014 AFC Champions League match against Yokohama F. Marinos on 15 April. He penned a 2-year loan contract with Ligue 1 side Olympique Lyonnais in summer 2014.
After returning from Lyon, he loaned to Chungju Hummel. In Chungju, he scored 13 goals and 7th place on goals in 2016 K League 2. In 2017, he moved to Bucheon FC 1995.

References

External links 

1995 births
Living people
Association football forwards
South Korean footballers
South Korean expatriate footballers
South Korean expatriate sportspeople in France
Expatriate footballers in France
Jeonbuk Hyundai Motors players
Olympique Lyonnais players
Chungju Hummel FC players
Bucheon FC 1995 players
Gyeongnam FC players
Gimhae FC players
K League 1 players
Ligue 1 players
K League 2 players
Korea National League players